The name Bonny has been used for four tropical cyclones in the Eastern Pacific Ocean.
 Tropical Storm Bonny (1960), formed southwest of Mexico and moved northwestward; did not make landfall.
 Tropical Storm Bonny (1968), moved parallel to Mexico but did not affect land.
 Tropical Storm Bonny (1972), never came near land and caused no known impact.
 Hurricane Bonny (1976), a Category 1 hurricane that formed near Mexico but moved out to sea.

See also
 Tropical Storm Bonnie, alternate spelling of the name, which is used for tropical cyclones in the Atlantic Ocean.

Pacific hurricane set index articles